Denys Vasylyovych Shelikhov (born 23 June 1989) is a Ukrainian professional footballer who plays as goalkeeper for LNZ Cherkasy.

Honours
Saburtalo Tbilisi
 Georgian Super Cup: Runner-Up 2019

Dnipro Dnipropetrovsk
 UEFA Europa League runner-up: 2014–15

External links
 Profile on Official Dnipro Website (Ukr)
 
 

1989 births
Living people
Sportspeople from Kherson
Ukrainian footballers
Ukraine under-21 international footballers
Association football goalkeepers
FC Dnipro players
FC Dnipro-75 Dnipropetrovsk players
FC Volyn Lutsk players
FC Isloch Minsk Raion players
FC Luch Minsk (2012) players
FC Saburtalo Tbilisi players
MFC Mykolaiv players
FC VPK-Ahro Shevchenkivka players
FC Metalist 1925 Kharkiv players
FC LNZ Cherkasy players
Ukrainian Premier League players
Ukrainian First League players
Ukrainian Second League players
Ukrainian expatriate footballers
Expatriate footballers in Belarus
Ukrainian expatriate sportspeople in Belarus
Expatriate footballers in Georgia (country)
Ukrainian expatriate sportspeople in Georgia (country)